The following is a list of notable graduates of Iona College (New York):

Academics
Abraham V. M, Vice-chancellor of Christ University, Bangalore.
 Regis J. Armstrong, professor at The Catholic University of America, expert on St. Francis of Assisi and Saint Clare of Assisi
Vincent Boudreau, Thirteenth President of the City College of New York (2017 to present), Interm President of the City College of New York (2016)
 James J. McGovern, former president of A.T. Still University

Arts & entertainment
 George Cain (1943–2010), author of Blueschild Baby
 Bud Cort, actor most famous for starring in Harold and Maude and MASH
 Kathleen P. Deignan, theologian and singer
 Tommy Dreamer (real name: Thomas Laughlin), former WWE professional wrestler and former ECW World Heavyweight Champion
 Terry Finn, actress
 John Gilchrist, former child actor known for playing 'Little Mikey' in Life cereal commercials
 Eileen Ivers, Irish-American musician
 Kyle Kulinski, political commentator and host of Secular Talk
 Tim McCarthy, VP of ESPN Radio
 Don McLean, American singer-songwriter most famous for the 1971 album American Pie, containing the songs "American Pie" and "Vincent"
 Antonio Broccoli Porto, Italian-Puerto Rican artist, visual artist and sculptor
Mandy Rose (Amanda Rose Saccomanno), American professional wrestler signed to WWE, television personality, and former fitness and figure competitor
 Donald Spoto '63, American celebrity biographer
 Daniel Tobin, American poet and 2009 Guggenheim Fellow
Terence Winch, Irish-American poet and songwriter

Business

 Laurence Boschetto, president & CEO and President of Draftfcb
 Ron Bruder, American entrepreneur who runs Middle East education non-profits, named on the Time 100.
 Ellis E. Cousens, executive vice president, CFO & COO of John Wiley & Sons
 Randy Falco, President and CEO of Univision Communications Inc., former chairman and CEO of AOL LLC
 Robert Greifeld, chairman and former president/CEO of NASDAQ
 James P. Hynes, founder of COLT Telecom Group
 Alfred F. Kelly Jr., chairman and CEO of Visa, Inc.
 Catherine R. Kinney, former president & co-COO of the New York Stock Exchange (NYSE).
 Maggie Timoney, CEO of Heineken, USA
 John Zaccaro, real estate developer and owner of P. Zaccaro & Company; husband of Geraldine Ferraro

Government
 Michael Benedetto, New York State Assembly member
 Ronald Blackwood, Mayor of Mount Vernon, New York (1985–1996), first elected black mayor in New York state
 John Bonacic, New York State Senator
 Timothy C. Idoni, Westchester County Clerk, former mayor of New Rochelle, New York
 Anthony T. Kane, former New York Supreme Court justice
 Edward R. Reilly '72, Maryland state senator
 Nicholas Spano, former New York state senator
 Kevin Sullivan, former White House Communications Director; honored with the NBA’s "lifetime achievement award" for PR
 John Sweeney, president of the AFL–CIO

Sports
 Mike Bertotti, former Major League Baseball pitcher with the Chicago White Sox
 Steve Burtt, Sr., former professional basketball player in the NBA; Steve and son, Steve Jr. are the all-time leading father-son scoring duo in NCAA history
 Tony DeMeo, college head football coach
 Eleri Earnshaw, current Wales international soccer player and soccer coach
 Kyle Flood, college head football coach
 Jerry Flora, college head football coach
 Sean Green, former professional basketball player in the NBA
 Richie Guerin, former professional basketball player and coach in the NBA
 Warren Isaac, former professional basketball player in Europe 
 Tariq Kirksay, professional basketball player in Europe; member of French national basketball team
 Dennis Leonard, former professional baseball player with the Kansas City Royals
 Brendan Malone, current professional basketball coach in the NBA
 Scott Machado, former professional basketball player in the NBA. Currently plays professionally in Europe.
 Nakiea Miller, professional basketball player
 Jason Motte, professional baseball player with the St. Louis Cardinals, who was the closer in Game 7 of the 2011 World Series
 Jeff Ruland, former professional basketball player in the NBA; current college basketball coach; star on 1980 Gaels team that went to the NCAA tournament.
 Mindaugas Timinskas, former professional basketball player in Europe and member of the Lithuanian national basketball team
 Vito Valentinetti, former professional baseball player with the Chicago Cubs, Cleveland Indians, Chicago White Sox and Washington Senators

Religion 
 Gerald Thomas Walsh, auxiliary bishop and vicar general of the Roman Catholic Archdiocese of New York

References

Iona University
Iona University alumni